The Gentleman Without a Residence (German: Der Herr ohne Wohnung) is a 1925 German silent comedy film directed by Heinrich Bolten-Baeckers and starring Georg Alexander, Georg John and Paul Otto. It was one of a number of popular comedies released by UFA alongside its more prestigious art films. The film's art direction was by Erich Czerwonski.

Cast
 Georg Alexander as Alfred 
 Georg John as Fürst 
 Paul Otto as Professor
 Julius Brandt as Droschkenkutscher 
 Richard Ludwig as Lawyer
 Heinrich Gotho as zweiter Professor 
 Margarete Lanner as Frau des Professors

See also
The Gentleman Without a Residence (1915)
The Gentleman Without a Residence (1934)
Who's Your Lady Friend? (1937)

References

Bibliography
 Kreimeier, Klaus. The Ufa Story: A History of Germany's Greatest Film Company, 1918-1945. University of California Press, 1999.

External links

1925 films
1925 comedy films
Films of the Weimar Republic
German silent feature films
German comedy films
Films directed by Heinrich Bolten-Baeckers
German films based on plays
Remakes of Austrian films
UFA GmbH films
German black-and-white films
Silent comedy films
1920s German films
1920s English-language films